WCW/nWo Revenge is a professional wrestling video game released in 1998 for the Nintendo 64 game console. It is the sequel to 1997's WCW vs. nWo: World Tour. Like its predecessor, Revenge features AKI's proprietary grappling system; as well as heavily improved graphics, a championship mode, and a large roster of wrestlers (real and fictional).

Revenge gained critical praise and tremendous commercial success. According to a 1999 article by IGN, Revenge was the best-selling wrestling game for the N64 console,  and at the time, was the top selling third-party Nintendo game ever.

Revenge was the last AKI-developed WCW game for the Nintendo 64. The next AKI wrestling game released for the console, WWF WrestleMania 2000, sported THQ's newly acquired World Wrestling Federation license.

Background
At the time of the game's release, the Monday Night Wars were starting to go in favor of the World Wrestling Federation (WWF). Despite this, WCW/nWo Revenge was generally recognized as the best wrestling game of 1998.

The Revenge grappling system is part of what ensured the game's success and popularity. The system was simple to learn and allowed for a variety of moves to be performed depending on the character. The graphics were improved from World Tour, and many new features were introduced to expand the popular series.

Reception

WCW/nWo Revenge surpassed the success of its predecessor, World Tour. Within a month, it became the highest selling console game in North America. Like its predecessor, Revenge also won 1998's "Fighting Game of the Year" by the Academy of Interactive Arts & Sciences, marking the second consecutive year an AKI/THQ title achieved the honor. It would quickly reach Player's Choice status and become heavily responsible for THQ's profits in late 1998 and '99, eventually selling 1.88 million copies in the US and ranking substantially among the best-selling N64 games.

Next Generation rated it four stars out of five, and stated that "the full exhibitionist phenomenon of professional wrestling is served up by Revenge better than by any other game we've seen."

Revenge'''s main competition that year was WWF War Zone by Acclaim, based on WCW's rival promotion, the World Wrestling Federation.

The game achieved critical favor for its numerous improvements on World Tour. Matt Casamassina of IGN commented: "More than any other wrestling game on the market, Revenge feels, moves and plays like the real thing. . . My suggestion: if you own World Tour then sell it. Take the money you get for it and put it towards Revenge. It's a much more complete game with tons of style and ambiance. Once again, the four-player mode is addictive and reason enough to buy the game, especially if you're a big wrestling fan." In IGN's 2008 "History of Wrestling Games" article, Rus McLaughlin also commended Revenge for its expanded roster, authentic venues, and "style to burn".

See also

List of licensed wrestling video gamesVirtual Pro Wrestling''

References

1998 video games
Asmik Ace Entertainment games
Nintendo 64 games
Nintendo 64-only games
Syn Sophia games
THQ games
World Championship Wrestling video games
Video game sequels
Video games developed in Japan
Professional wrestling games
D.I.C.E. Award for Fighting Game of the Year winners